Aurelio Grimaldi (born 22 November 1957) is an Italian film director and screenwriter. His film The Whores was entered into the 1994 Cannes Film Festival.

Selected filmography
 Ragazzi fuori (1990)
 The Rebel (1993)
 The Whores (1994)
 The Man-Eater (1999)

References

External links

1957 births
Living people
People from Modica
Italian film directors
Italian screenwriters
Italian male screenwriters
Film people from Sicily